This is a list of the Canadian Billboard magazine Canadian Hot 100 number-ones of 2014.

Note that Billboard publishes charts with an issue date approximately 7–10 days in advance.

A Canadian flag denotes a Canadian artist.

Chart history

See also
List of number-one digital songs of 2014 (Canada)
List of number-one albums of 2014 (Canada)

References

Canada Hot 100
2014
2014 in Canadian music